Walter Underwood & Partners were a Glasgow-based firm of architects that operated from 1960 to 1991.

History

Walter Underwood & Partners was formed in May 1960 by Walter Underwood after leaving Wylie, Shanks & Underwood with colleagues Michael Beale and T George Low. In 1964, three further colleagues were made partners; David J Leslie, James M Paton and William McLean.

Underwood died in April 1988, and the partnership was wound up in 1991 when some partners retired.

Projects

 Fulton Building, University of Dundee, 1962
 Queen Margaret Union, University of Glasgow, 1968
 Bruce Hotel, East Kilbride Shopping Centre, 1969
 Bank of England Branch Treasury, Glasgow, 1970s
 Martyrs Church of Scotland, Townhead, 1975
 Food Science Building, University of Strathclyde, 1981
 Fountain House, Clydesdale Bank, Glasgow, 1981

References

1960 establishments in Scotland
1991 disestablishments in Scotland
Defunct companies of Scotland
Architecture firms of Scotland
Organisations based in Glasgow